or Kojima is an uninhabited volcanic island in the Sea of Japan,  southwest of the mainland portion of the town of Matsumae and is the southernmost point in Hokkaidō. It is under the administration of the district of Matsumae in Oshima Subprefecture in Hokkaido, Japan.

Ko Island is the world's smallest volcanic island. The island is an andesitic stratovolcano. The peak consists of non-alkali mafic rocks, dating from the Early Pleistocene overtop of non-alkali felsic rocks from the Late Miocene-Pliocene.

Several smaller islets surround Ko Island, including Daihiyakushima, Shohiyakushima, Tenjinshima, and Sazaeshima.

To provide refuge for fishing vessels, a small harbor has been put in place.

Flora and fauna
Ko Island has been designated a natural monument. It is a breeding ground for common guillemot, Japanese cormorant, and black-tailed gull. The island, along with some neighbouring islets, have been recognised as an Important Bird Area (IBA) by BirdLife International because they also support colonies of rhinoceros auklets.

 to the west of Ko Island is the Ko Island Bank, where migratory fish tend to gather. In the adjacent seas there is also tuna and squid. For this reason it is a major fishing area for fishermen out of Matsumae, especially because of the decline in the Arabesque greenling over the last 24 to 25 years.

The predominant vegetation on the island is grasses, but there are stands of Acer pictum subsp. mono in the caldera.

See also

 Desert island
 Lists of islands

References

Sources
 Based on the translation of :ja:渡島小島 on 14 December 2008
 

Islands of Hokkaido
Islands of the Sea of Japan
Volcanoes of Hokkaido
Stratovolcanoes of Japan
Uninhabited islands of Japan
Matsumae, Hokkaido
Important Bird Areas of Japan
Seabird colonies
Pleistocene stratovolcanoes